Sela pri Dobovi is a settlement northwest of Dobova in the Municipality of Brežice in eastern Slovenia. The area is part of the traditional region of Styria. It is now included with the rest of the municipality in the Lower Sava Statistical Region.

Name
The name of the settlement was changed from Sela to Sela pri Dobovi in 1953.

References

External links
Sela pri Dobovi on Geopedia

Populated places in the Municipality of Brežice